Victor Bangert (born 28 November 1950) is Professor of Mathematics at the Mathematisches Institut in Freiburg, Germany. His main interests are differential geometry and dynamical systems theory. He specialises in the theory of closed geodesics, wherein one of his significant results, combined with another one due to John Franks, implies that every Riemannian 2-sphere possesses infinitely many closed geodesics. He also made important contributions to Aubry–Mather theory.

He obtained his Ph.D. from Universität Dortmund in 1977 under the supervision of Rolf Wilhelm Walter, with the thesis Konvexität in riemannschen Mannigfaltigkeiten.

He served in the editorial board of "manuscripta mathematica" from 1996 to 2017.

Bangert was an invited speaker at the 1994 International Congress of Mathematicians in Zürich.

Selected publications

References

External links 
Personal webpage
Oberwolfach photos of Victor Bangert

20th-century German mathematicians
21st-century German mathematicians
1950 births
Living people
Geometers
Dynamical systems theorists
Scientists from Osnabrück